Stiphodon elegans is a species of freshwater goby. It is found in Polynesia, from Wallis and Futuna, Samoa, Cook Islands and French Polynesia. It occurs in clear, fast flowing streams in rainforest near the coast and it feeds on algae.

References 

 Masuda, H., K. Amaoka, C. Araga, T. Uyeno and T. Yoshino, 1984. The fishes of the Japanese Archipelago. Vol. 1. Tokai University Press, Tokyo, Japan. 437 p

elegans
Taxa named by Franz Steindachner
Fish described in 1879
Freshwater fish of Oceania